Ranveer Singh Brar (born 8 February 1978) is a Lucknow-born and bred Indian celebrity chef, Masterchef India judge, author and restaurateur. He is well known as the host of popular Television food shows and as a judge in three seasons (four, six and seven) of MasterChef India, alongside fellow chefs Sanjeev Kapoor (Season 4), Vikas Khanna (all seasons),Vineet Bhatia (Season 6) & Garima Arora (Season 7) .

He has set up restaurants in India and abroad and curated the menu of many more. He also has a YouTube channel with over 6 million subscribers.

Early life and education
Born in Lucknow, India, into Sikh family to Ishwar Singh and Surinder Kaur, Brar was inspired by the local Kebab vendors in Lucknow at a young age which led him to pursue his love for food. He did his schooling from HAL school Lucknow.

His passion to learn the art led him to volunteer as an apprentice to one of them, Munir Ustad.
Though his family initially resisted, they finally gave in, leading Brar to join Institute of Hotel Management, Lucknow, for a more formal initiation into the culinary world.

Career (restaurants and associations)
After completing his education at IHM, Brar began his career at the Taj Mahal Hotel. In 2001, at Fort Aguada Beach Resort in Goa, he opened "Morisco" a seafood restaurant, "il Camino" an Italian restaurant and "Fishtail" a small open air barbeque eatery. Back in Delhi in 2003, he was part of the newly opened Radisson Blu Hotel, Noida. He also became the youngest executive chef of his time in the country at the age of 25.

He then left for Boston, Massachusetts, where he opened "Banq", a fine Franco-Asian restaurant. Banq won numerous awards including the Best New Restaurant in the World by the magazine "Wallpaper". The restaurant is now permanently closed.

Following this, he was appointed Corporate Chef for the One World Hospitality Group, one of the oldest restaurant groups in Boston. Back in India, he joined Novotel, Juhu Beach, Mumbai, as the Senior Executive Chef.

Brar designed a menu for the MTV India chain of restaurants, launched by Viacom 18 consumer products wing. FLYP @ MTV, the first restaurant opened in Delhi in mid-December 2015, with the next launch in Chandigarh, and the third instalment in Mumbai fall of 2017.

He created and launched an 'artisan' line of meal kits in association with Haute Chef in December 2015.

He also launched a premium  patisserie called English Vinglish in Mumbai in spring 2016 featuring fusion Indian desserts, breads and bakes.

He opened an all-vegetarian fine-dining restaurant in Mumbai in Dec 2016 called TAG Gourmart Kitchen by Ranveer Brar, as well as the restaurant Mayura (now closed) in the Greater Toronto Area, Canada in 2017.

Brar was responsible for the F&B conceptualization for the restaurants at the heritage property Alila at Bishangarh by Alila Hotels and Resorts

He was brought on board Royal Caribbean International for curating gourmet Indian food on two of their cruise liners on their Singapore sailings. He also associated with Thomas Cook India for curating the menu for niche Indian travelers traveling abroad.

Brar toured different cities in India alongside Mercedes-Benz India via the Ranveer Brar Culinary Academy, hosting cooking workshops and demos pan India, as part of the former's Luxe Drive Live campaign.

Television and digital shows
Zee Khana Khazana / Living Foodz / Zee Zest

He has hosted various cookery shows on Zee Zest (formerly known as Zee Khana Khazana Channel and Living Foodz):
Breakfast Xpress & Snack Attack
 The Great Indian Rasoi Seasons 1 & 2
Home  
Health Bhi Taste Bhi
Ranveer's Cafe
Food Tripping along with Chef Gautam Mehrishi.
Global Menu
Northern Flavours - Meethi Masti
 Station Master's Tiffin - In October 2018, he hosted a unique travel and food show based on Indian Railways for Living Foodz
 Himalayas the Offbeat Adventure - In 2019, he hosted this landmark travel show covering lesser known places, tribes and cuisines across the Himalayas 

Thank God Its Fryday - Zoom (Indian TV channel)

Brar has hosted Seasons 1, 2 and 3 of Thank God Its Fryday in association with Philips India on Zoom (TV channel), where he visited iconic eateries across India and recreated his own versions of their famous dishes in the Philips Airfryer 

Masterchef India

Season 7 of the show (2023) saw the return of Chef Brar as a judge along with Chef Vikas Khanna and first time judge, Chef Garima Arora.
Chef Brar debuted as a judge in Season 4 (2014) MasterChef India along with chefs Sanjeev Kapoor and Vikas Khanna and appeared again in Season 6 (2020)  with chefs Vineet Bhatia and Vikas Khanna

Sony BBC Earth

In the summer of 2018, he curated and presented Secrets Behind Food for Sony BBC Earth comprising three shows: Supermarket Secrets, Food Factory Supersized and Food Detectives.

Raja Rasoi Aur Andaaz Anokha - Epic TV

Hosted 2 seasons of a back to roots and explorative food show for Epic TV titled Raja Rasoi Aur Andaaz Anokha which saw him recreating food history and traditional recipes from across Indian regions set in an idyllic bungalow complete with traditional cooking implements 

Colors TV

Featured as a Judge in a cooking based reality show on Colors TV (Viacom 18) called Rasoi ki Jung Mummyon ke Sung in November 2017.

Ranveer On The Road - Digital Series

Launched a new mini-video series on Twitter titled Ranveer On The Road, in July 2016, covering his culinary sojourn through Australia, Seychelles, Turkey and Thailand.

Maa ki Baat - Digital Series

Hosted a successful digital series on his social media channels titled Maa ki Baat
He also has over 4.1 million subscribers on his personal YouTube Channel.

Home Made Love - Digital Series, TLC

The success of Maa ki Baat led to a similar televised series for TLC (TV network) India YouTube channel, presenting festival special recipes from homemakers across different cuisines.

You Got Chef'd - Digital Series, Gobble

Chef Brar has co-hosted Seasons 2 & 3 of You Got Chef'd by Gobble in association with Dewar's along with John Dewar's sons India brand ambassador Greg Benson. The show brings together celebs from the digital & reel world in a fun format, wherein they are challenged by Brar and Greg to complete 'tasks' to earn points and get Chefd  

Modern Love Mumbai, Amazon Prime Video
Ranveer Brar co-starred alongside Pratik Gandhi in one of the 6 stories, directed by Hansal Mehta. The episode centers around a gay couple finding their footing in a society that is not so welcoming of their relationship

Books
Launched his first book titled '('Come Into My Kitchen )aamar ranna ghare aasun.
 in summer 2016, an auto biography covering his journey from the streets of Lucknow, through Boston to Mumbai and his culinary adventures and memories in route.

This was followed by a second book titled A Traditional Twist in association with Bertolli India, showcasing a myriad of recipes, both Indian and Global

Mobile app

Launched his own mobile app at the beginning of 2019, in collaboration with Hungama Digital Media which is a near exhaustive repository of all his recipes, presented in Text and visual formats.

Awards, associations and recognition
Brar is an Honorary member at the James Beard Foundation and recognised by the same for his culinary contribution.

He has received recognition for his contribution to various cuisines by several institutions such as AIWF, AICA, as also the Mayor of Boston. In addition he has also represented India at the WPF.

He has handled banquets at the Rashtrapati Bhawan and at the Prime Minister's residence, plus cooked for several Hollywood and Bollywood celebrities, both in the US and India.

Ranveer Brar has been associated with several brands in the capacity of culinary consultant and brand ambassador. Brands he has been associated with are - Mercedes-Benz India (past), Bertolli Olive oil (past), SunGold Kiwifruit in India marketed by Zespri International (past), Gadre Marine Export Pvt Ltd (past), Philips India Kitchen Appliances (current), Parag Milk Foods (current), Victorinox (Current), among others.

Ranveer Brar was awarded 'Indian of the Year' for Chef and TV Host of the year 2017.

He also received LFEGA ‘Food Entertainer of the Year’ for 2018.
In 2021, Brarwas awarded for Outstanding Contribution to the Food and Beverage Industry'' 2021 by Food Connoisseurs India Convention

References

External links
 
 Harper Collins Chef profile

1978 births
Living people
Writers from Lucknow
Indian chefs
Chefs of Indian cuisine
Indian television presenters
Indian television chefs
Indian food writers